The Chiapan deer mouse (Peromyscus zarhynchus) is a species of rodent in the family Cricetidae. It is found only in Mexico.

Distribution and habitat
The Chiapan deer mouse is endemic to central and southeast Chiapas, México. The species occurs in wet highland cloud and pine-oak forest, where it inhabits forest stages ranging from mature forest to cutover areas at elevations between 1,400 m and 2,900 m. Below 2,200 m it only occurs in tall mature forests. Possible specimens from Guatemala have not yet been confirmed.

Conservation
The Chiapan deer mouse is categorized as Vulnerable by the IUCN as suitable habitat in its restricted range is estimated to have shrunk by more than 50% in the last 30 years.

References

Further reading

Peromyscus
Mammals described in 1898
Taxonomy articles created by Polbot
Taxa named by Clinton Hart Merriam